Suburban Songbook is the second studio album by Australian singer-songwriter Kevin Mitchell, under the pseudonym Bob Evans, vocalist and guitarist for Perth band Jebediah. It was produced by Brad Jones (Josh Rouse, Yo La Tengo, Sheryl Crow, Jill Sobule) at the 'Alex the Great Studios' in Nashville, Tennessee.

At the 2006 ARIA Awards, Suburban Songbook won the "Best Adult Contemporary Album" and at the J Award of 2006, the album was nominated for Australian Album of the Year. Bob Evans was also nominated for an Australian Music Prize for the album. It debuted at #15 on the ARIA album charts. In October 2010, it was listed in the book, 100 Best Australian Albums. It was also re-released in a deluxe format featuring promotional clips and exclusive footage and audio.

Background

“I wanted to really push the idea and feeling of turning the `Suburban Everyday’ into something of almost fairytale quality,” Mitchell explains. “Of romanticism. That magic can happen in the suburbs every single day. Almost like making a record where within the stories it’s like everything’s happening on Christmas morning. There’s that little hint of magic in the air.” – Kevin Mitchell

Singles

The first single released off the album was "Don't You Think It's Time", and the second was "Nowhere Without You", which debuted at #84 on the Australian ARIA Singles Chart. Both songs had music videos released for them.

The third song released was "Friend", although only as a radio single, the video for which is currently available on YouTube and Yahoo! Music Australia & New Zealand.

The final song lifted from the album was "Sadness and Whiskey", which coincided with Mitchell's national tour of Australia in June and July 2007.

Track listing

Personnel
Kevin Mitchell - vocals, guitar, harmonica, bells, claps, baby piano, mandolin
Brad Jones - harmonium, bass guitar, piano, guitar, casio, organ, moog synthesizer, mandolin
Jim Hoke - flute, saxophone, autoharp
Pete Finney - guitar
Ken Coomer - drums, tambourine
Chris Carmichael - cello, viola, violin
David Henry - cello
Neil Rosengarden - trumpet, baritone horn, trombone

Charts

Certifications

References

2006 albums
ARIA Award-winning albums
Kevin Mitchell (musician) albums